Nigeria Private University Games Association (often abbreviated as NPUGA Games) is a national sporting competition, organized by the Committee of Vice Chancellors and Registrars for private universities in Nigeria. By constitution, the 74 private universities accredited by the National Universities Commission are eligible to compete; however, only 36 of them are listed as affiliated universities on the official website of the games.

Founded in 2003, the competition is held once every two years at a host university. The objectives of the games according to the organizers are to promote national unity through sports; encourage physical and mental fitness among its participants; and act as a preparatory phase for athletes who could potentially represent Nigeria at international competitions. The games competed for by participating universities includes athletics, badminton, basketball, chess, football, Scrabble, swimming, table tennis, tennis and volleyball.

Akintunde Akinola, from Achievers University is the current president of the association. Durogbade Adejoke, a gold medalist from the games, represented Nigeria at All African Games and Olympic Games.

At the sixth edition, Al-Hikmah University were suspended for two years for not displaying the spirit of sportsmanship during an event.

Benson Idahosa University have won the most medals since the inception of the games.

List of presidents

Winners by medals table  
The number of gold medals won in the competition are written in parentheses.

References

External links 
 List of winners

Sports governing bodies in Nigeria
2003 establishments in Nigeria
Recurring sporting events established in 2003
Sports organizations established in 2003
Multi-sport events